Closeness is a 2017 Russian drama film directed by Kantemir Balagov, in his feature film debut. It was selected to compete in the Un Certain Regard section at the 2017 Cannes Film Festival. At Cannes, it won the FIPRESCI Prize in the Un Certain Regard section.

Plot
In 1998 at Nalchik, 24-year-old Ilana (Zhovner) works in her father's garage to help him make ends meet. One evening, her extended family and friends gather to celebrate the engagement of her younger brother David. Later that night, the young couple is kidnapped, and a ransom demand delivered.

Cast
 Darya Zhovner as Ilana 
 Olga Dragunova as Adina
 Artem Tsypin as Avi
 Nazir Zhukov as Zalim
 Veniamin Katz as David
 Michail Amburg as Moshe

Reception
Closeness grossed $184,008 worldwide. On review aggregator Rotten Tomatoes, the film holds an approval rating of 87% based on 15 reviews, with an average rating of 7.69/10. On Metacritic, the film has a weighted average score of 53 out of 100 based on 8 critics, indicating "mixed or average reviews".

References

External links
 
 

2017 films
2017 drama films
2017 directorial debut films
Russian drama films
2010s Russian-language films